Honor America Days are a United States Federal Observance observed June 14 to July 4. According to 36 U.S.C. § 112, the 21 days from Flag Day through Independence Day (including, as of 2021, the federal holiday of Juneteenth) is a period to honor the United States. On these days, U.S. Congress declares that there be public gatherings and activities during that period at which the people of the United States can celebrate and honor their country in an appropriate way. The period was enacted into law on August 12, 1998, when President Bill Clinton signed H.R.1085, drafted by Rep. Henry Hyde, to designate "Patriotic and National Observances, Ceremonies, and Organizations" under federal law.

Notes

Observances in the United States
June observances
July observances